The First Evangelical Reformed Church on Kentucky Route 80 in the small community of Bernstadt, Kentucky,  is a historic church built in 1884.  It has also been known as Swiss Colony Church.  It was added to the National Register of Historic Places in 1980.

It was built by Swiss immigrants who were recruited to move from Switzerland to Laurel County, Kentucky in the late 1800s.

See also
National Register of Historic Places listings in Kentucky

References

Presbyterian churches in Kentucky
National Register of Historic Places in Laurel County, Kentucky
Churches on the National Register of Historic Places in Kentucky
Swiss-American history
Churches completed in 1884